The 1892–93 Northern Football League season was the fourth in the history of the Northern Football League, a football competition in Northern England.

Clubs

The league featured 6 clubs which competed in the last season, no new clubs joined the league this season.

Newcastle East End changed name to Newcastle United.

League table

References

1892-93
1892–93 in English association football leagues